In the mathematical discipline of graph theory, the (m,n)-tadpole graph is a special type of graph consisting of a cycle graph on m (at least 3) vertices and a path graph on n vertices, connected with a bridge.

See also
 Barbell graph
 Lollipop graph

References

Parametric families of graphs